Eugenia Grandet is a 1918 Italian silent historical drama film directed by Roberto Roberti and starring Francesca Bertini. It is based on the 1833 novel Eugénie Grandet by Honoré de Balzac.

Plot

References

External links

Films based on Eugénie Grandet
Films directed by Roberto Roberti
Italian silent films
Italian historical films
1910s historical films
Italian black-and-white films
1910s Italian-language films